Love Marriage may refer to:
Love marriage, a marital union based on love, affection and attraction
Love Marriage (1959 film)
Love Marriage (1975 film), an Indian Malayalam film
Love Marriage (1984 film)
Love Marriage (2001 film)
Love Marriage (2015 film)
Love Marriage (TV series)
Love Marriage (novel), a novel by V. V. Ganeshananthan

See also 
 Love and Marriage (disambiguation)